My Kind of Music is a 1961 album by Mel Tormé. This was the last album that Tormé recorded for Verve Records.

Track listing 
 "You and the Night and the Music" (Howard Dietz, Arthur Schwartz) – 2:28
 "A Stranger in Town" (Mel Tormé) – 2:55
 "I Guess I'll Have to Change My Plan" (Dietz, Schwartz) – 3:07
 "Born to Be Blue" (Tormé, Robert Wells) – 2:55
 "County Fair" (Tormé) – 6:23
 "Dancing in the Dark" (Dietz, Schwartz) – 2:41
 "Welcome to the Club" (Tormé) – 4:01
 "By Myself" (Dietz, Schwartz) – 3:19
 "The Christmas Song" (Tormé, Wells) – 2:48
 "Alone Together" (Dietz, Schwartz) – 2:47
 "A Shine on Your Shoes" (Dietz, Schwartz) – 3:13

Personnel 
 Mel Tormé - vocals
 Wally Stott - arranger, conductor
 Geoff Love
 Tony Osborne

References 

1961 albums
Mel Tormé albums
Verve Records albums
Albums arranged by Wally Stott
Albums conducted by Wally Stott